The Live Wire is a 1935 American adventure film directed and produced by Harry S. Webb for Reliable Pictures, starring stuntman Richard Talmadge in the lead role.

Plot 
Two Professors find an ancient vase at a shop on the docks. They track down Dick Nelson (Richard Talmadge), the sailor who sold it after finding it on an island where he was shipwrecked as a boy.

Professors Sneed (Henry Roquemore) and Harris (Jimmy Aubrey) charter a ship to have Dick guide them to find more ancient treasures on this uncharted island; but they don’t want Captain King (Charles K. French) to bring his daughter Madge (Alberta Vaughn), who usually sails with him, saying it will be too dangerous for a woman to go with them.

Sam the Cook (Sam McDaniel) helps Madge stow away aboard the ship. When she is found she pretends to be a boy, just hired on as a steward.

Dick’s old nemesis “Bull” Dennis (George Walsh) has been hired on to replace the First Mate. Like Long John Silver, Bull plans a mutiny to keep all the treasure for himself and his pirate comrades.

It looks like Dick and Madge, with the help of Sam and the others, are going to foil the mutineer’s plan; but the ship is lost in a fire, and, unbeknownst to each other, they all end up shipwrecked on the mysterious island.

At first Bill can’t remember where the ruins are, but he soon finds an entire lost city and civilization. Soon, however, they are fighting for their lives with the pirates to get off the island alive.

Cast 
Richard Talmadge as 2nd Mate Dick Nelson
Alberta Vaughn as Madge King
George Walsh as Mate 'Bull' Dennis
George Chesebro as Henchman Jacquard
Charles K. French as Capt. King
Martin Turner as Sam
Henry Roquemore as Prof. Sneed
Jimmy Aubrey as Prof. Harris
Ben Hall as Steve (the Steward)

Production
Although, a Reliable Pictures release, much of it was filmed on existing sets, at Universal , and footage from the 1934 serial Pirate Treasure was reused. The dock scenes were filmed in San Pedro, California.

After appearing in over 130 films, this was Alberta Vaughn's last movie.

References

External links 

 
 

1935 films
1935 adventure films
American black-and-white films
Seafaring films
Reliable Pictures films
American adventure films
Films directed by Harry S. Webb
1930s English-language films
1930s American films
English-language adventure films